Pterogastra is a genus of flowering plants belonging to the family Melastomataceae.

Its native range is Northern and Western South America.

Species:

Pterogastra divaricata 
Pterogastra minor

References

Melastomataceae
Melastomataceae genera
Taxa named by Charles Victor Naudin
Taxa described in 1850